The 1999–2000 Munster Rugby season was Munster's fifth season as a professional team, during which they competed in the IRFU Interprovincial Championship and Heineken Cup. It was Declan Kidney's second season in his first spell as head coach of the province.

1999–2000 squad

Friendlies

1999–2000 IRFU Interprovincial Championship

1999–2000 Heineken Cup

Pool 4

Quarter-final

Semi-final

Final

References

External links
1999–2000 Munster Rugby season official site 
1999–2000 Munster Rugby Heineken Cup

1999–2000
1999–2000 in Irish rugby union